Below is a list of the all-time top-grossing films in Singapore (based on total receipts to December 2011) in Singapore dollars:

Top-grossing films of all time 
The highest-grossing films in Singapore, by box office gross revenue, are as follows.

Top-grossing films in 2003

Top-grossing films in 2004 
Figures are as at 31 December 2004, with The Incredibles and Kung Fu Hustle were still being screened at that time.

Top-grossing films in 2005
Figures are as at 31 December 2005, with Harry Potter and the Goblet of Fire and King Kong were still being screened at that time.

Top-grossing films in 2006
Figures are as at 30 December 2006, with Casino Royale and Happy Feet were still being screened at that time.

Top-grossing films in 2007

Top-grossing films in 2008 
All figures provided are from Box Office Mojo in US dollars. (Figures are accurate as of 2 October 2018)

Top-grossing films in 2009 

All figures provided are from Box Office Mojo in US dollars. (Figures are accurate as of 2 October 2018)

Top-grossing films in 2010 

All figures provided are from Box Office Mojo in US dollars. (Figures are accurate as of 2 October 2018)

Top-grossing films in 2011 

All figures provided are from Box Office Mojo in US dollars. (Figures are accurate as of 2 October 2018)

Top-grossing films in 2012 
All figures provided are from Box Office Mojo in US dollars. (Figures are accurate as of 22 May 2018)

Top-grossing films in 2013 
All figures provided are from Box Office Mojo in US dollars. (Figures are accurate as of 22 May 2018)

Top-grossing films in 2014 

All figures provided are from Box Office Mojo in US dollars. (Figures are accurate as of 2 October 2018)

Top-grossing films in 2015 

All figures provided are from Box Office Mojo in US dollars. (Figures are accurate as of 2 October 2018)

Top-grossing films in 2016 

All figures provided are from Box Office Mojo in US dollars. (Figures are accurate as of 2 October 2018)

Top-grossing films in 2017 

All figures provided are from Box Office Mojo in US dollars. (Figures are accurate as of 2 October 2018)

Top-grossing films in 2018 

All figures provided are from Box Office Mojo and 8 Days in Singapore dollars. (Figures are accurate as of 2 March 2019)

Top-grossing films in 2019 
All figures provided are from Box Office Mojo and 8 Days in Singapore dollars. (Figures are accurate as of 20 January 2020)

Top-grossing films in 2020 
All figures provided are from Box Office Mojo. Box office were suspended from March 27 to July 12, 2020 due to the government regulation on suspension as a result of COVID-19 pandemic.

Top-grossing films in 2021 
All figures provided are from Box Office Mojo.
(Figures in Singapore dollars, as of 5 April 2021)

See also 
 List of highest-grossing films
 List of top-grossing movies in the United States and Canada

References

External links
 Singapore Media Fusion
 Singapore Film Commission Website

Lists of Singaporean films
Singapore